İrfan Can Eğribayat (born 30 June 1998), is a Turkish professional footballer who plays as a goalkeeper for Fenerbahçe, on loan from Göztepe.

Professional career
Eğribayat made his debut for Adanaspor in a 4-3 TFF First League win over Elazığspor on 16 May 2015. He made his professional debut in a 1-1 Süper Lig tie with Konyaspor on 20 May 2017. On 5 September 2020, he transferred to Göztepe in the Süper Lig.  In his debut season with Göztepe, Eğribayat earned the starting spot and gained international attention for his performances.

Career statistics

International career
Eğribayat is a youth international for Turkey, having represented the Turkey U16s, U17s, U18s, U19s and U21s.

References

External links
 
 
 

Living people
1998 births
People from Adana
Association football goalkeepers
Turkish footballers
Turkey youth international footballers
Süper Lig players
TFF First League players
Adanaspor footballers
Göztepe S.K. footballers
Fenerbahçe S.K. footballers